The Assistant Secretary of Defense for Indo-Pacific Security Affairs, or ASD (IPSA), is the principal advisor to the Under Secretary of Defense for Policy (USD(P)) and the Secretary of Defense on international security strategy and policy on issues of DoD interest that relate to the governments and defense establishments of the nations and international organizations within the Asia-Pacific region. The position was originally titled Assistant Secretary of Defense for Asian and Pacific Security Affairs but was renamed by the Trump Administration alongside the renaming of the United States Indo-Pacific Command.

Office holders

Role and responsibilities
Like the Assistant Secretary of Defense for International Security Affairs, the ASD (IPSA) is responsible for oversight of security cooperation programs and foreign military sales programs within the regions under its supervision. The ASD (IPSA) also works closely with the United States Indo-Pacific Command, United States Central Command, and the Asia-Pacific Center for Security Studies. Finally, the ASD (IPSA) represents the USD(P) and the Secretary of Defense in interagency policy deliberations and international negotiations related to the Asia-Pacific region. The Office of the ASD (IPSA) is an entity of the Office of the Secretary of Defense.

Structure
This office was created in 2007. It is composed of at least six country/sub-regional desks, each staffed by a Senior Country Director. Most desks are also supported by an Assistant Country Director or group of Country Directors. As of February 2011, the desks listed on the APSA website included:

 Australia, New Zealand, and South Pacific Islands
 Burma, Cambodia, Laos, Thailand, Vietnam
 China, Hong Kong, Mongolia, Taiwan
 Japan
 Korea
 Indonesia, Malaysia, Philippines, Singapore, Brunei, East Timor

However, this list must be incomplete, since the office also has oversight of programs in Central Asia, Afghanistan and Pakistan, as well as India and other Asian nations.

Depending on their areas of coverage, the country/sub-regional desks report to four different Deputy Assistant Secretaries: 
 DASD East Asia
 DASD China
 DASD South & Southeast Asia
 DASD Afghanistan, Pakistan and Central Asia.

DASDs are appointed by the Secretary of Defense. Some are appointed from civilian life, while others are career defense officials. Once at the DASD level, the latter are considered a part of the DoD Senior Executive Service.

The ASD (APSA) is also supported by a Principal Deputy, or PDASD, who helps oversee the DASDs and the office's country/sub-regional desks.

Principal Deputy Assistant Secretaries for Asian and Pacific Security Affairs/Indo-Pacific Security Affairs

Deputy Assistant Secretaries of Defense Reporting to the ASD (APSA)

The list below details both the current DASD and previous DASD posts in this office.

References

External links 
 

 
United States–Asian relations
United States–Oceanian relations